Hector Mor Maclean, or Eachann Mor Maclean in Scottish Gaelic, may refer to:

Hector Mor Maclean, 12th Chief, (died 1568), Chief of Clan MacLean
Hector Mor Maclean, 16th Chief, (circa 1600–1626), Chief of Clan MacLean